This is a list of commercial hot sauces. Variations on a company's base product are not necessarily common, and are not always included.

Scoville heat ratings vary depending on batch. However, many companies do not disclose numeric ratings for their products at all. "Extra hot" versions may be advertised as several times hotter than the original, without specifying the heat of the original.
 Some companies do not disclose which peppers are used.
 Labels reading "pepper" and "aged pepper" may refer to a similar aged mash.



Hot sauces

See also

 Chili sauce
 List of condiments
 List of sauces
 water pepper

Notes

References

Further reading
 

Condiments
 
hot